Cupido pierde a Paquita ("Cupid Loses Paquita") is a 1955 Mexican film. It stars Carlos Orellana.

Cast
 María Victoria as Paquita (as Maria Victoria 'Paquita')
 Julio Aldama as Julio
 Carlos Orellana as don Severo
 Fernando Soto as Firulais; Espiridión (as Fernando Soto 'Mantequilla')
 Malú Azcárraga as Rosita
 Carlos Martínez Baena as don Feliciano
 Javier de la Parra as Pepe
 Paz Villegas as doña Sofía
 Carmen Manzano as Juana la charrasqueada
 Lola Casanova as Adela
 Tito Novaro as Muñeco
 José Pardavé as Juan, chofer

External links
 

1955 films
Mexican black-and-white films
1950s Spanish-language films
1950s Mexican films